Coimbatore South may refer to:
 Coimbatore-South taluk
 Coimbatore South (state assembly constituency)